An ogive is the roundly tapered end of a two-dimensional or three-dimensional object.

Ogive may also refer to:
 Ogives, a set of four piano pieces composed by Erik Satie
 Ogive (glacier), a banding feature of a glacier
 Eadgifu of Wessex, the daughter of Edward the Elder
 Ogive (statistics), a graph showing the curve of a cumulative distribution function